A cat organ or cat piano ( or Katzenklavier,  or piano à chats/piano chats) is a hypothetical musical instrument which consists of a line of cats fixed in place with their tails stretched out underneath a keyboard so that they cry out when a key is pressed. The cats would be arranged according to the natural tone of their voices.

Origins 
There is no official record of a cat organ actually being built; rather it is described in literature as a bizarre concept. "The details of the cat organ present it clearly as an instrument cat lovers might wish was a fictional horror." The instrument is used in stories which criticize the cruelty of royalty while the piganino, a similar instrument using pigs, has been used to criticize the poor.

This instrument was described by the French writer Jean-Baptiste Weckerlin in his book Musiciana, extraits d'ouvrages rares ou bizarres (Musiciana, descriptions of rare or bizarre inventions):

The instrument was described by German physician Johann Christian Reil (1759–1813) for the purpose of treating patients who had lost the ability to focus their attention. Reil believed that if they were forced to see and listen to this instrument, it would inevitably capture their attention and they would be cured: "A fugue played on this instrument--when the ill person is so placed that he cannot miss the expression on their faces and the play of these animals--must bring Lot's wife herself from her fixed state into conscious awareness."

The instrument was first described by Athanasius Kircher in his 1650 work Musurgia Universalis, though the lack of an image may have left doubt in the minds of some writers. (The New York Times, for example, has carried an article claiming he described the instrument, and another stating he did not describe it in Musurgia Universalis.). His description appears in Book 6, Part 4, Chapter 1, under the heading "Corollaria," (emphasis added):

The citation is noted by Kircher's student Gaspar Schott in Magia Naturalis naturae et artis, Part 2, Book 6, Pragmatia 2, titled "Felium Musicam exhibere [Cat Concert]."

Modern citations and reconstructions 
In Herbet Rosendorfer's short story "The Career of Florenzo Waldweibel-Hostelli" (1970), the ormizellic cat organ (with 72 tied-up cats, arranged according to voice or better meow pitch) is mentioned. 

Michael Betancourt compares the sampling of cats' meows used in Jingle Cats' albums, Meowy Christmas (1993) and Here Comes Santa Claws (1994), to the cat organ, in that both require cats, but diminish each performer's importance.

Kircher notes that the instrument can be used to reduce the melancholy of princes by moving them to laughter, almost exactly the situation that occurred in 2010 when King Charles was greatly amused by a performance of the tune "Over the Rainbow" on an instrument recreated using squeaky toy cats by Henry Dagg for a garden party held at Clarence House supporting Charles's Start initiative for sustainable living.

Terry Gilliam's 1988 film The Adventures of Baron Munchausen features a scene with a similar organ that uses human prisoners instead of cats.

In 2009, The People's Republic of Animation, a professional animation studio, released an animation titled The Cat Piano. This work tells the tale of a city of cats whose musicians are kidnapped by a human in order to make a cat piano. This short film has received several awards, as well as nominations for awards. The academy announced that it was shortlisted for an Oscar for Best Animated Short. However, it was not nominated.

See also 
 Terry Jones – Monty Python's performer on a similar fictional instrument, the mouse organ (Musical Mice sketch)
 Marvin Suggs – a character from The Muppet Show who plays a muppaphone
 The Singing Dogs – a series of novelty recordings.
 Donald Barthelme – The character Mr. Peterson, in the story "A shower of gold", is visited by a tall, foreign-looking man with a huge switchblade, who announces himself as the cat-piano player.
 Fatso, better known as Keyboard Cat, a cat that played the piano

Notes

References

Further reading 
 Champfleury. Les Chats, Paris, 1870.
 Calvete de Estrella, Juan Christobal (1930). El Felicisimo Viaje del Muy Alto y Muy Poderoso Principe Don Felipe, p. 73–7. Madrid: La Sociedad de Bibliofilos Espanoles.
 de Estrella, Juan Christoval Calvete (1552). El Felicissimo Viaje d'el Muy Alto y Muy poderoso Principe Don Phelippe. Antwerp.

External links 
 Interactive Katzenklavier, a project on Scratch that allows for the user to play a virtual Katzenklavier by pressing the keyboard.

Cat equipment
Cruelty to animals
Fictional musical instruments
Keyboard instruments
Zoomusicology
Athanasius Kircher
Fictional cats
Cat folklore